Susan G. Ernst is professor emerita at Tufts University known for her work on cell development using sea urchins as a model system. She is an elected fellow of the American Association for the Advancement of Science.

Academic career 
Ernst graduated with honors from Louisiana State University in 1968 with a B.S. in Zoology. She received her Ph.D. in Zoology in 1975 from the University of Massachusetts Amherst. After completing post-doctoral fellowships first at Case Western Reserve and then the California Institute of Technology, Ernst became an Assistant Professor at Tufts University in 1979. From 1997 to 2005, Ernst held a number of deanships at Tufts serving, most notably, as the Dean of the School of Arts and Sciences from 2001 to 2005. Throughout this time she continued to teach undergraduate and graduate courses and pursue her research. In 2005, Ernst returned to teaching and research full-time.

Research 
Her research is in Developmental biology and primarily focuses on the role of the Endo16 gene in embryogenesis. She uses the sea urchin as her model system for research. Her work includes investigations into RNA in sea urchins, and the proteins produced during the development of sea urchins. Ernst has mentored undergraduate students, including Michael Levin who worked with her on applying electrical fields to sea urchin embryos.

Selected publications

Awards and honors 
Ernst was elected a fellow of the American Association for the Advancement of Science in 1997.

References

21st-century American biologists
Living people
Louisiana State University alumni
Year of birth missing (living people)